The 30 Foot Bride of Candy Rock is a 1959 comedy science fiction film starring Lou Costello and Dorothy Provine and directed by Sidney Miller.

Plot
Artie Pinsetter is a junk collector and amateur inventor who lives in the desert town of Candy Rock. Artie's fiancée, Emmy Lou Raven, is exposed to radiation in a cave and is thereby transformed into a thirty-foot giant. When Artie nervously explains to his betrothed's rich uncle that she has gotten "big", the uncle misunderstands "big" as "pregnant", and insists that Artie marry her immediately. After comic hilarity ensues, Artie is eventually able to restore her to normal size. But the final scene shows Pinsetter's dog has been enlarged to giant size, suggesting further problems.

Cast
 Lou Costello as Artie Pinsetter
 Dorothy Provine as Emmy Lou Raven
 Gale Gordon as Rossiter
 Lenny Kent as The Sergeant 
 Charles Lane as Standard Bates
 Jimmy Conlin as Magruder
 Will Wright as Pentagon General
 Peter Leeds as Bill Burton

Production 
The 30 Foot Bride of Candy Rock was filmed from December 3 through December 22, 1958, and is the only film that Lou Costello starred in without his longtime professional partner, Bud Abbott.  It is based on an original screenplay titled The Secret Bride of Candy Rock Mountain.

The film was not released until August 1959, five months after Costello died of a heart attack.

Much of the outdoor footage was shot at the Iverson Movie Ranch in Chatsworth, California, including a number of scenes depicting the oversized blonde beauty at her new home—a barn. The barn was part of a ranch set on the Upper Iverson known as the Fury Set, which was originally built for the television show Fury.

In popular culture
Clips from the film were used for a parody in the music video "She Will Have Her Way" by Neil Finn.

Home media
Sony Pictures Home Entertainment released the film as a made-to-order DVD on September 13, 2010.

References

External links 
 
 
 
 

1959 films
American science fiction comedy films
American black-and-white films
1950s science fiction comedy films
1950s English-language films
Films about size change
Films about giants
Columbia Pictures films
Films scored by Raoul Kraushaar
1959 comedy films
1950s American films